"God Shuffled His Feet" is a song by Canadian folk rock group Crash Test Dummies and was the fourth and final single from their 1993 album of the same name. The synthesized guitar solo is performed by guest artist Adrian Belew. Released in October 1994, the song reached number 14 on Canada's RPM Top Singles chart, topping the Adult Contemporary chart in the process, and peaked at number three in Iceland.

Music video
The music video directed by Tim Hamilton features a group of people gathering in a theatre to hear God speak only to find out that he is a puppet operated by an old man in the back (a la The Wizard of Oz).

Charts

Weekly charts

Year-end charts

References

1993 songs
1994 singles
Crash Test Dummies songs
Song recordings produced by Jerry Harrison
Songs written by Brad Roberts
Bertelsmann Music Group singles
Arista Records singles